Yury Kazlow (born 21 May 1991) is a Belarusian professional footballer who plays for Molodechno.

References

External links 
 
 

1991 births
Living people
Sportspeople from Vitebsk
Belarusian footballers
Association football midfielders
FC Minsk players
FC Kommunalnik Slonim players
FC Luch Minsk (2012) players
FC Dnyapro Mogilev players
FC Slutsk players
FC Neman Grodno players
FC Naftan Novopolotsk players
FC Molodechno players